The Fronde was a series of civil wars in the Kingdom of France between 1648 and 1653, occurring in the midst of the Franco-Spanish War, which had begun in 1635. King Louis XIV confronted the combined opposition of the princes, the nobility, the law courts (parlements), as well as most of the French people, and managed to subdue them all. The dispute started when the government of France issued seven fiscal edicts, six of which were to increase taxation. The parlements resisted and questioned the constitutionality of the King's actions and sought to check his powers.

The Fronde was divided into two campaigns, the Parlementary Fronde and the Fronde of the Princes. The timing of the outbreak of the Parlementary Fronde, directly after the Peace of Westphalia (1648) that ended the Thirty Years' War, was significant. The nuclei of the armed bands that terrorized parts of France under aristocratic leaders during that period had been hardened in a generation of war in Germany, where troops still tended to operate autonomously. Louis XIV, impressed as a young ruler with the experience of the Fronde, came to reorganize French fighting forces under a stricter hierarchy, whose leaders ultimately could be made or unmade by the King. Cardinal Mazarin blundered into the crisis but came out well ahead at the end. The Fronde represented the final attempt of the French nobility to do battle with the king, and they were humiliated. In the long term, the Fronde served to strengthen royal authority, but weakened the economy. The Fronde facilitated the emergence of absolute monarchy.

The Spanish Empire, which had promoted the Fronde to the point that without its support, it would have had a more limited character, benefited from the internal upheaval in France since it contributed to the Spanish military's renewed success in its war against the French between 1647 and 1656, so much so that the year 1652 could be considered a Spanish annus mirabilis. Only the later English intervention in the war in favor of France would change the situation.

Name

The French word fronde means "sling"; Parisian crowds used slings to smash the windows of supporters of Cardinal Mazarin. Jean François Paul de Gondi, Cardinal de Retz, attributes the usage to a witticism in Book II of his Memoirs: "Bachoumont once said, in jest, that the Parlement acted like the schoolboys in the Paris ditches, who fling stones [frondent, that is, fling using slings], and run away when they see the constable, but meet again as soon as he turns his back." He goes on to state that emblems based on that nickname became quite popular and were placed on hats, fans and gloves and even were baked onto bread.

Origins

The insurrection did not start with revolutionary goals but aimed to protect the ancient liberties from royal encroachments and to defend the established rights of the parlements – courts of appeal rather than legislative bodies like the English parliaments – and especially the right of the Parlement of Paris to limit the king's power by refusing to register decrees that ran against custom. The liberties under attack were feudal of not individuals but chartered towns, where they defended the prerogatives accorded to offices in the legal patchwork of local interests and provincial identities that was France. The Fronde in the end provided an incentive for the establishment of royalist absolutism, since the disorders eventually discredited the feudal concept of liberty.

The pressure that saw the traditional liberties under threat came in the form of extended and increased taxes as the Crown needed to recover from its expenditures in the recent wars. The costs of the Thirty Years' War (1618–1648) constrained Mazarin's government to raise funds by traditional means, the impôts, the taille, and the occasional aides. The nobility refused to be so taxed, based on their old liberties, or privileges, and the brunt fell upon the bourgeoisie.

The movement soon degenerated into factions, some of which attempted to overthrow Mazarin and to reverse the policies of his predecessor Cardinal Richelieu (in office 1624–1642) who had taken power for the crown from great territorial nobles, some of whom became leaders of the Fronde. When Louis XIV became king in 1643, he was only a child, so France was ruled by Anne of Austria and though Richelieu had died the year before, his policies continued to dominate French life under his successor Cardinal Mazarin. Most historians consider that Louis's later insistence on absolutist rule and depriving the nobility of actual power was a result of those events in his childhood. The term frondeur was later used to refer to anyone who suggested that the power of the king should be limited and has now passed into conservative French usage to refer to anyone who shows insubordination or engages in criticism of the powers in place.

First Fronde, the Parlementary Fronde (1648–1649)

In May 1648 a tax levied on judicial officers of the Parlement of Paris provoked not merely a refusal to pay but also a condemnation of earlier financial edicts and a demand for the acceptance of a scheme of constitutional reforms framed by a united committee of the parlement (the Chambre Saint-Louis), composed of members of all the sovereign courts of Paris.

The military record of the Parlementary Fronde is almost blank. In August 1648, feeling strengthened by the news of the Louis II de Bourbon, Prince de Condé's victory at Lens (20 August 1648), Mazarin suddenly arrested the leaders of the parlement, whereupon Paris broke into insurrection and barricaded the streets.

The noble faction demanded the calling of an assembly of the Estates General, which had last been convoked in 1615. The nobles believed that in the Estates-General, they could continue to control the bourgeois element, as they had in the past.

The royal faction, having no army at its immediate disposal, had to release the prisoners and to promise reforms; on the night of 22 October, it fled from Paris. However France's signing of the Peace of Westphalia (Treaty of Münster, 24 October 1648) allowed the French army to return from the frontiers, and by January 1649, Condé had put Paris under siege. The two warring parties signed the Peace of Rueil (11 March 1649) after little blood had been shed. The Parisians, though still and always anti-cardinalist, had refused to ask for Spanish aid, as proposed by their princely and noble adherents under Armand de Bourbon, prince de Conti, and having no prospect of military success without such aid, the noble party submitted to the government and received concessions.

Second Fronde, the Fronde of the Princes (1650–1653)

From then on the Fronde became a story of intrigues, half-hearted warfare in a scramble for power and control of patronage, losing all trace of its first constitutional phase. The leaders were discontented princes and nobles: Gaston, Duke of Orleans (the king's uncle); the great Louis II, Prince de Condé and his brother Armand, Prince of Conti; Frédéric, the Duke of Bouillon, and his brother Henri, Viscount of Turenne. To those must be added Gaston's daughter, Mademoiselle de Montpensier; Condé's sister, Madame de Longueville; Madame de Chevreuse; and the astute intriguer Jean François Paul de Gondi, the future Cardinal de Retz. The military operations fell into the hands of war-experienced mercenaries, led by two great, and many lesser, generals.

January 1650 – December 1651

The peace of Rueil lasted until the end of 1649. The princes, received at court once more, renewed their intrigues against Mazarin. On 14 January 1650, Cardinal Mazarin, having come to an understanding with Monsieur Gondi and Madame de Chevreuse, suddenly arrested Condé, Conti, and Longueville. This time, it was Turenne, before and afterwards the most loyal soldier of his day, who headed the armed rebellion. Listening to the promptings of Madame de Longueville, he resolved to rescue her brothers, particularly Condé, his old comrade in the battles of Freiburg and Nördlingen.

Turenne hoped to do that with Spanish assistance; a powerful Spanish army assembled in Artois under Archduke Leopold Wilhelm of Austria, governor-general of the Spanish Netherlands, but peasants of the countryside rose against the invaders; the royal army in Champagne was in the capable hands of César de Choiseul, comte du Plessis-Praslin, who counted 52 years of age and 36 of war experience; and the little fortress of Guise successfully resisted the archduke's attack.

At that point Mazarin drew upon Plessis-Praslin's army for reinforcements to be sent to subdue the rebellion in the south forcing the royal general to retire. Then Archduke Leopold Wilhelm decided that he had spent enough of King Philip IV of Spain's money and men in the French quarrel. His regular army withdrew into winter quarters, and left Turenne to deliver the princes with a motley host of Frondeurs and Lorrainers. Plessis-Praslin by force and bribery secured the surrender of Rethel on 13 December 1650 and Turenne, who had advanced to relieve the place, fell back hurriedly. But he was a terrible opponent, and Plessis-Praslin and Mazarin himself, who accompanied the army, had many misgivings as to the result of a lost battle. The marshal chose nevertheless to force Turenne to a decision, and the Battle of Blanc-Champ (near Sommepy-Tahure) or Rethel was the consequence.

Both sides were at a standstill in strong positions, Plessis-Praslin doubtful of the trustworthiness of his cavalry, but Turenne was too weak to attack, when a dispute for precedence arose between the French Guards Regiment and the Picardie regiment. The royal infantry had to be rearranged in order of regimental seniority, and Turenne, seeing and desiring to profit by the attendant disorder, came out of his stronghold and attacked with the greatest vigour. The battle (15 December 1650) was severe and for a time doubtful, but Turenne's Frondeurs gave way in the end, and his army, as an army, ceased to exist.

Condé, Conti, and Longueville were released, and by April 1651 the rebellion had everywhere collapsed. Then followed a few months of hollow peace and the court returned to Paris. Mazarin, an object of hatred to all the princes, had already retired into exile. His absence left the field free for mutual jealousies, and for the remainder of the year anarchy reigned in France.

December 1651 – February 1653
In December 1651, Cardinal Mazarin returned to France with a small army. The war began again, and this time, Turenne and Condé were pitted against each other.

After that campaign, the civil war ceased, but in the several other campaigns of the Franco-Spanish War that followed, the two great soldiers were opposed to one another, Turenne as the defender of France, Condé as a Spanish invader.

The début of the new Frondeurs took place in Guyenne (February–March 1652), while their Spanish ally, the archduke Leopold Wilhelm, captured various northern fortresses. On the Loire, where the centre of gravity was soon transferred, the Frondeurs were commanded by intriguers and quarrelsome lords, until Condé's arrival from Guyenne. His bold leadership made itself felt in the Bléneau (7 April 1652) in which a portion of the royal army was destroyed, but fresh troops came up to oppose him. From the skillful dispositions made by his opponents, Condé felt the presence of Turenne and broke off the action. The royal army did likewise. Condé invited the commander of Turenne's rearguard to supper, chaffed him unmercifully for allowing the prince's men to surprise him in the morning, and by way of farewell remarked to his guest,  ("It's too bad decent people like us are cutting our throats for a scoundrel")—an incident and a remark that displayed the feudal arrogance which ironically led to the iron-handed absolutism of Louis XIV.

As to the latter, Turenne maneuvered past Condé and planted himself in front of the mercenaries, and their leader, not wishing to expend his men against the old French regiments, consented to depart with a money payment and the promise of two tiny Lorraine fortresses.

A few more manœuvers, and the royal army was able to hem in the Frondeurs in the Faubourg St. Antoine (2 July 1652) with their backs to the closed gates of Paris. The royalists attacked all along the line and won a signal victory in spite of the knightly prowess of the prince and his great lords, but at the critical moment Gaston's daughter persuaded the Parisians to open the gates and to admit Condé's army. She herself turned the guns of the Bastille on the pursuers. An insurrectionist government appeared in Paris and proclaimed Monsieur lieutenant-general of the realm. Mazarin, feeling that public opinion was solidly against him, left France again, and the bourgeois of Paris, quarreling with the princes, permitted the king to enter the city on 21 October 1652. Mazarin returned unopposed in February 1653.

Spanish Fronde

The Fronde as a civil war was now over. The whole country, wearied of anarchy and disgusted with the princes, came to look to the king's party as the party of order and settled government, and thus the Fronde prepared the way for the absolutism of Louis XIV. The general war continued in Flanders, Catalonia, and Italy wherever a Spanish and a French garrison were face to face, and Condé, with the wreck of his army, openly and defiantly entered the service of the king of Spain. The "Spanish Fronde" was almost purely a military affair.

In 1653, France was so exhausted that neither invaders nor defenders were able to gather supplies to enable them to take the field until July. At one moment, near Péronne, Condé had Turenne at a serious disadvantage but could not galvanize Spanish General Count Fuensaldaña, who was more solicitous to preserve his master's soldiers than to establish Condé as mayor of the palace to the king of France and the armies drew apart again without fighting. In 1654 the principal incident was the siege and relief of Arras. On the night of 24/25 August the lines of circumvallation drawn round that place by the prince were brilliantly stormed by Turenne's army and Condé won equal credit for his safe withdrawal of the besieging corps under cover of a series of bold cavalry charges led by himself as usual, sword in hand.

In 1655, Turenne captured the fortresses of Landrecies, Condé and St Ghislain. In 1656 the prince of Condé avenged the defeat of Arras by storming Turenne's circumvallation around Valenciennes (16 July) but Turenne drew off his forces in good order. The campaign of 1657 was uneventful and is only to be remembered because a body of 6,000 English infantry, sent by Oliver Cromwell in pursuance of his treaty of alliance with Mazarin, took part in it. The presence of the English contingent and its purpose of making Dunkirk a new Calais, to be held by England forever, gave the next campaign a character of certainty and decision which was entirely wanting in the rest of the war.

Dunkirk was besieged promptly in great force and when Don Juan of Austria and Condé appeared with the relieving army from Fumes, Turenne advanced boldly to meet them. The Battle of the Dunes, fought on 14 June 1658, was the first real trial of strength since the battle of the Faubourg St Antoine. Successes on one wing were compromised by failure on the other but in the end Condé drew off with many losses, the success of his cavalry charges having entirely failed to make good the defeat of the Spanish right wing among the dunes.

Here the "red-coats" made their first appearance on a continental battlefield, under the leadership of Sir William Lockhart, Cromwell's ambassador at Paris. They astonished both armies by the stubborn fierceness of their assaults. Dunkirk fell and was handed over to the English Protectorate, as promised, flying the St George's Cross until Charles II sold it to the king of France in 1662.

A last desultory campaign followed in 1659—the twenty-fifth year of a conflict between France and Spain which had begun during the Thirty Years' War—and the peace of the Pyrenees was signed on 5 November. On 27 January 1660 the prince asked and obtained at Aix-en-Provence the forgiveness of Louis XIV. The later careers of Turenne and Condé were as obedient subjects of their sovereign.

See also
 Reapers' War

References

Sources
 Bonney, Richard J. "The French Civil War, 1649–53." European History Quarterly (1978) 8#1 pp: 71–100.
 Bonney, Richard J. Society and Government in France under Richelieu and Mazarin, 1624–1661 1988. With 309 original documents table of contents
 
 Knecht, Robert Jean. The French civil wars, 1562–1598 (Longman, 2000)
 Ranum, Orest A. The Fronde: A French Revolution, 1648–1652 (WW Norton, 1993)
 Treasure, Geoffrey. "The Fronde, Part II: The Battle for France History Today (1978) 28#7 pp 436–445, popular summary; online
 

In French
 Amable Guillaume Prosper Brugière, baron de Barante, Le Parlement de Paris et vie de M. Molé (Paris, 1859)
 Memoirs of Cardinal de Retz
 Lettres du Cardinal Mazarin (Paris, 1878–1906)
 Louis Madelin, La Fronde (Paris: Flammarion, 1931)

17th-century conflicts
Civil wars involving the states and peoples of Europe
Revolution-based civil wars
Wars involving France
Political history of the Ancien Régime
Military history of the Ancien Régime
17th century in France
Cardinal Mazarin
The Fronde